The 2016 Women's Euro Winners Cup was the first edition of Women's Euro Winners Cup, an annual continental beach soccer tournament for top European women's clubs. Organised by Beach Soccer Worldwide (BSWW), the championship is the sport's version of the UEFA Women's Champions League in association football.

Held in Catania, Italy from 24 to 29 May 2017 in tandem with the men's edition, the event started with a round robin group stage. At its conclusion, the best teams progressed to the knockout stage, a series of single elimination games to determine the winners. Consolation matches were also played to determine other final rankings. 

The tournament was won by Swiss team Grasshoppers who beat Germany's BeachKick Ladies Berlin in the final to win their first European title.

Participating teams
12 teams entered the inaugural tournament from nine countries – the top-level domestic beach soccer league/championship champions plus, for some countries, other top non-champions clubs from the nation indicated.

Draw
The draw to split the 12 teams into three groups of four took place in the morning of 4 May in the host city of Cantaia, Italy alongside the men's competition draw.

As the club representing the host city Catania, DomusBet Catania BS were assigned to Group A. The other teams were then drawn to one of the three groups. Clubs from the same country could not be drawn into the same group.

Group stage
Matches took place at the DombusBet Arena.

All times are local, CEST (UTC+2).

Group A

Group B

Group C

Ranking of third placed teams

9th–12th place play-offs
The teams finishing in fourth place and the worst third placed team were knocked out of title-winning contention, receding to play in consolation matches to determine 9th through 12th place in the final standings.

9th–12th place semi-finals

Eleventh place play-off

Ninth place play-off

Knockout stage
The group winners, runners-up and two best third placed teams progressed to the knockout stage to continue to compete for the title.

Quarter-finals
The losers receded to play in consolation matches to determine 5th through 8th place in the final standings.

The winners proceeded to continue to compete for the title.

Semi-finals

5th–8th place

1st–4th place

Finals

Seventh place play-off

Fifth place play-off

Third place play-off

Final

Awards

Final standings

See also
2016 Euro Winners Cup (men's edition)

External links
Euro Winners Cup 2016, at Beach Soccer Worldwide (archived)
Euro Winners Cup Women 2016, at Beach Soccer Russia (in Russian)

References

Women's Euro Winners Cup
Euro
2016
Women's Euro Winners Cup
Sport in Catania
Women's Euro Winners Cup